Sarawut Inpaen (born March 3, 1992) is a Thai footballer who plays as a centre back or a left back for a Thai League 1 club Lamphun Warrior.

Honours

Club
Chiangrai United
 Thai League 1: 2019
 Thai FA Cup: 2018, 2020–21
 Thai League Cup: 2018
 Thailand Champions Cup: 2018, 2020

References

External links
 Sarawut Inpaen's info at Thai league official website – thaileague.co.th.
 

1992 births
Living people
Sarawut Inpaen
Association football defenders
Sarawut Inpaen
Sarawut Inpaen
Sarawut Inpaen
Sarawut Inpaen